Scottish pound may refer to:

 Banknotes of Scotland, banknotes of the pound sterling (GBP) issued by one of three Scottish banks
 Pound Scots, the former currency of Scotland until the Acts of Union 1707
 Scottish independence#Currency, hypothetical currency should Scotland become independent